Spaceship Records (also known as Spaceship Entertainment or Spaceship), is a Nigerian based record label founded by recording artist Burna Boy, as a flagship of Spaceship Collective. The label was launched in 2015, and is home to recording acts, Nissi, and Burna Boy. It also houses producer LeriQ, and Telz. Artists formerly signed to the label, include Bnxn.

History
Spaceship Entertainment, was founded on 18 February 2015 by Burna Boy. In 2020, it began to operate under the name Spaceship Records. The record label, was relaunched under Spaceship Collective, and currently holds the highest share in the company. Spaceship was established following Burna Boy's departure from Aristokrat Records, a record label owned by Piriye Isokrari.

In 2020, Burna Boy signed LeriQ, Nissi, and Telz to Spaceship. On 16 April 2020, Burna Boy unveiled the signing of Buju.

Departure

Buju
Buju's departure surfaced after his one years deal with Spaceship expired in April 2021, during his stay with the label, he released  and promoted, various singles with Spaceship including "Lenu (remix)" with Burna Boy, and "So Lonely".

Accolades
Spaceship was nominated for Record Label of the Year at The Beatz Awards 2019.

Artists
Current acts

Former acts

Producers
Current producers
LeriQ
Telz

Discography
Albums/Mixtape/EP

References 

Record labels established in 2015
Nigerian record labels
Companies based in Lagos